The 1998 Singapore Open was a men's tennis tournament played on Indoor Hard in Singapore, Singapore that was part of the Championship Series of the 1998 ATP Tour. It was the seventh edition of the tournament and was held from 12 October – 18 October.

Seeds
Champion seeds are indicated in bold text while text in italics indicates the round in which those seeds were eliminated.

Draw

Finals

References

Doubles
Singapore Open (men's tennis)